Plesiochelys is a genus of late Jurassic European and Asian turtle. The type species is Plesiochelys etalloni. 

Fossil records have discovered Plesiochelys bigleri and Plesiochelys etalloni from the Kimmeridge Clay of England and outside the Swiss and French Jura Mountains.

A recent study placed Plesiochelys as an Angolachelonia and outside Testudines.

References

Sources 
Gaffney, Eugene S. "A taxonomic revision of the Jurassic turtles Portlandemys and Plesiochelys. American Museum Novitates; no. 2574." (1975).
Anquetin, J., & Chapman, S. D. "First report of Plesiochelys etalloni and Tropidemys langii from the Late Jurassic of the UK and the palaeobiogeography of plesiochelyid turtles. Royal Society Open Science." (2016).

External links 

Late Jurassic reptiles of Europe
Plesiochelyidae
Late Jurassic turtles
Late Jurassic reptiles of Asia
Fossil taxa described in 1837